Chaparral High School is a public high school in the community of Phelan in the Victor Valley of the Mojave Desert, located in San Bernardino County, California.

The high school is within the Snowline Joint Unified School District. It is accredited by the Western Association of Schools and Colleges.

The school's athletic teams are known as the Panthers.

Description
The school is a continuation high school, and was named by the California State Board of Education to be a Model Continuation High School. The school opened in 1982.

Students can take part in after-school clubs like music, poetry and gardening and play competitive sports against other continuation schools. Unlike in most 9-12 high schools, there are no 9th graders attending.

See also

References

External links
Chaparral High School website

High schools in San Bernardino County, California
Continuation high schools in California
Public high schools in California
Victor Valley
Wrightwood, California
1982 establishments in California